Even Bigger, Even Better Power Ballads III - The Greatest Driving Anthems in the World... Ever! is the 3rd edition in The Greatest Driving Anthems in the World... Ever! series, which is a part of The Best... Album in the World...Ever! brand. Each album includes some of the biggest power ballads since the 1960s, while one album specifically includes Sixties Power Ballads. This album was released November 15, 2005 and  includes 36 epic rock love songs.
In 2007, the album was also released in an Australian edition under the name of Bigger, Better Power Ballads II. The album includes 56 epic rock love songs as well as a different album cover.
In 2009, the album was once again released in an Australian edition under the name of Bigger, Better Power Ballads III. The three CD album includes 57 epic rock love songs as well as a different album cover

Track List 1

Disc 1
Queen - "Somebody to Love" (1975)
Robbie Williams - "Angels" (1997)
Anastacia - "Left Outside Alone" (2003)
The Calling - "Wherever You Will Go" (2001)
Oasis - "Little by Little" (2002)
4 Non Blondes - "What's Up?" (1994)
Cher - "I Found Someone" (1989)
Tina Turner - "We Don't Need Another Hero (Thunderdome)" (1986)
Meat Loaf - "Two Out of Three Ain't Bad" (1977)
Maria McKee - "Show Me Heaven" (1989)
Jamelia - "Stop!" (2005)
Labi Siffre - "(Something Inside) So Strong" (1987)
Joe Cocker & Jennifer Warnes - "Up Where We Belong" (1981)
Roy Orbison - "Crying" (1962)
Air Supply - "All Out of Love" (1980)
Toto - "I Won't Hold You Back" (1982)
Marillion - "Lavender" (1987)
Pandora's Box - "It's All Coming Back to Me Now" (1989)

Disc 2
Europe - "The Final Countdown" (1987)
Bonnie Tyler - "Holding Out for a Hero" (1984)
Belinda Carlisle - "Leave a Light On" (1989)
Cheap Trick - "I Want You to Want Me" (1979)
Roxette - "The Look" (1989)
Foreigner - "Cold as Ice" (1978)
Huey Lewis and the News - "If This Is It" (1985)
REO Speedwagon - "Take It On the Run" (1981)
Journey - "Don't Stop Believin'" (1981)
Stevie Nicks - "Rooms on Fire" (1989)
Carly Simon - "Nobody Does It Better" (1976)
Paul Carrack - "When You Walk in the Room" (1987)
Mike + The Mechanics - "Over My Shoulder" (1995)
Joe Cocker - "You Can Leave Your Hat On" (1983)
The Tubes - "Don't Want to Wait Anymore" (1979)
The Animals - "The House of the Rising Sun" (1964)
Deep Purple - "Child in Time" (1972)
Meat Loaf - "I'd Lie for You (And That's the Truth)" (1983)

Track List 1 Australia

Disc 1
Meat Loaf - "I'd Do Anything for Love (But I Won't Do That)" (1993)
The Fray - "How to Save a Life" (2006)
Pink - "Who Knew" (2006)
Nickelback - "Photograph" (2005)
Elton John - "Don't Let the Sun Go Down on Me" (1974)
David Bowie - "Life on Mars?" (1973)
Phil Collins - "Against All Odds (Take a Look at Me Now)" (1982)
Cher - "I Found Someone" (1989)
Foreigner - "Waiting for a Girl Like You" (1982)
Toto - "Africa" (1982)
Belinda Carlisle - "Leave a Light On" (1989)
Richard Marx - "Hazard" (1989)
Tina Turner - "Private Dancer" (1984)
Shakespears Sister – "Stay" (1992)
Mr. Big - "To Be with You" (1991)
Live - "Run to the Water" (2000)
The Bangles - "Eternal Flame" (1989)
Youth Group - "Forever Young" (2006)
Brian May - "Too Much Love Will Kill You" (1993)

Disc 2
Queen - "Somebody To Love" (1975)
The Pretenders - "I'll Stand by You" (1995)
REO Speedwagon - "Can't Fight This Feeling" (1985)
Kiss - "Shandi" (1980)
Boston - "More Than a Feeling" (1976)
Pat Benatar - "We Belong" (1982)
Peter Cetera - "Glory of Love" (1986)
Backstreet Boys - "Incomplete" (2005)
Avril Lavigne - "I'm with You" (2002)
Alannah Myles - "Black Velvet" (1989)
Soul Asylum - "Runaway Train" (1992/1993)
Lifehouse - "Hanging by a Moment" (2001)
Collective Soul - "The World I Know" (1995)
Bonnie Tyler - "Holding Out for a Hero" (1984)
Kim Carnes - "Bette Davis Eyes" (1981)
Eric Carmen - "Make Me Lose Control" (1983)
Cyndi Lauper - "All Through The Night" (1985)
Prince – "Purple Rain" (1987)

Disc 3
Hinder - "Lips of an Angel" (2006)
Kelly Clarkson - "Behind These Hazel Eyes" (2005)
Tonic - "You Wanted More" (1999)
Patti Smith Group - "Because the Night" (1978)
Ugly Kid Joe - "Cats in the Cradle" (1993)
Joan Osborne - "One of Us" (1995)
Duran Duran - "Come Undone" (1995)
The Verve Pipe - "The Freshmen" (1998)
Staind - "It's Been Awhile" (2001)
Roxette - "Listen to Your Heart" (1989)
The Babys - "Isn't it Time" (1979)
Moving Pictures - "What About Me" (1982)
The Moody Blues - "Nights in White Satin" (1967/1972)
Alice Cooper – "Only Women Bleed" (1975)
Skid Row - "I Remember You" (1989)
Warrant - "Heaven" (1989)
Journey - "Open Arms" (1982)
Joe Cocker & Jennifer Warnes - "Up Where We Belong" (1981)
Roxy Music - "Jealous Guy" (1980)

Track List 2 Australia

Disc 1
Queen - "Who Wants To Live Forever" (1989)
Snow Patrol - "Chasing Cars" (2006)
Katy Perry - "Thinking Of You" (2008)
The Fray - "You Found Me" (2008)
The Last Goodnight - "Pictures Of You" (2007)
OneRepublic - "Stop And Stare" (2007)
Nickelback - "If Everyone Cared" (2007)
Avril Lavigne - "When You're Gone" (2007)
Lifehouse - "You And Me" (2005)
Secondhand Serenade - "Fall For You" (2008)
Hinder - "Better Than Me" (2006)
Maroon 5 - "Won't Go Home Without You" (2007)
Saving Abel - "Addicted" (2008)
Christina Aguilera - "Fighter" (2003)
Live - "The Dolphins Cry" (2000)
Vertical Horizon - "Everything You Want" (1999)
Nick Lachey - "What's Left Of Me" (2006)
Backstreet Boys - "Drowning" (2001)
Prince & The New Power Generation - "Diamonds And Pearls" (1992)
Radiohead - "Creep" (1992)

Disc 2
Belinda Carlisle - "Leave A Light On" (1989)
Roy Orbison - "I Drove All Night" (1982)
Cyndi Lauper - "Time After Time" (1983)
Jon Secada - "Just Another Day" (1995)
Lisa Edwards - "Cry" (1994)
Tears For Fears - "Shout" (1984)
Sophie B. Hawkins - "Damn I Wish I Was Your Lover" (1992)
Seal - "Kiss From A Rose" (1994/1995)
Jann Arden - "Insensitive" (1995)
Blessid Union Of Souls - "I Believe" (1995)
Cher - "Just Like Jesse James" (1990)
Elton John - "The One" (1992)
Duran Duran - "Save A Prayer" (1985)
The Pretenders - "Hymn To Her" (1989)
Martha Davis - "Don't Tell Me The Time" (1987)
Richard Marx - "Right Here Waiting" (1989)
Andreas Johnson - "Glorious" (1998)
A-ha - "The Sun Always Shines On Tv" (1985)

Disc 3
Meat Loaf - "Two Out Of Three Ain't Bad" (1977)
Carly Simon - "You're So Vain" (1973)
Roxy Music - "More Than This" (1982)
Deborah Harry - "French Kissin' In The USA" (1986)
Heart - "What About Love?" (1985)
Divinyls - "I Touch Myself" (1991)
Survivor - "Burning Heart" (1986)
Journey - "Don't Stop Believin'" (1981)
Tina Turner - "What's Love Got To Do With It" (1983)
Reo Speedwagon - "Keep On Loving You" (1981)
Steve Perry - "Oh Sherrie" (1984)
Mike Reno & Ann Wilson - "Almost Paradise (Love Theme From Footloose)" (1985)
Chicago - "You're The Inspiration" (1985)
Firehouse - "When I Look Into Your Eyes" (1992)
Europe - "Carrie" (1988)
T'pau - "China In Your Hand" (1987)
The Motels - "Total Control" (1983)
Ultravox - "Vienna" (1983)
Mike + The Mechanics - "The Living Years" (1988)

References

 Even Bigger, Even Better Power Ballads III - Track List 1 (front- and backcover)
 [ Even Bigger, Even Better Power Ballads III - Track List 1]
 Bigger, Better Power Ballads II - Track List 1 Australia
 Bigger, Better Power Ballads III - Track List 2 Australia

2005 compilation albums
2007 compilation albums
2009 compilation albums